Reginald Harold Bungay (5 February 1911–1986) was an English professional footballer who played in the Football League for Bristol City, Mansfield Town and Plymouth Argyle as a left back.

Career statistics

References

1911 births
1986 deaths
English footballers
Association football defenders
English Football League players
Oxford City F.C. players
Tottenham Hotspur F.C. players
Plymouth Argyle F.C. players
Bristol City F.C. players
Mansfield Town F.C. players
Leyton Orient F.C. players